Jorge Sáenz de Miera Colmeiro (born 17 November 1996), known simply as Jorge , is a Spanish professional footballer who plays as a central defender for CD Leganés on loan from Valencia CF.

Club career

Tenerife
Born in Santa Cruz de Tenerife, Canary Islands, Jorge started playing in CD Tenerife's youth setup. He made his senior debut with the reserves in the 2012–13 season, in Tercera División.

Jorge played his first match as a professional on 4 January 2015, starting in a 1–1 home draw against Sporting de Gijón in the Segunda División. On 20 August, he was definitely promoted to the first team. 

On 31 January 2016, Jorge was sent off for two bookings in the first half of a 2–1 loss at Gimnàstic de Tarragona. He scored his first league goal on 21 January 2018, but in a 1–3 home defeat to FC Barcelona B.

Valencia
Jorge signed a five-year contract with La Liga club Valencia CF on 25 February 2019 for a transfer fee of €3 million, effective as of 1 July. On 15 July, he joined RC Celta de Vigo in the same league on a two-year loan, with an option to make the deal permanent for €7 million as Maxi Gómez moved in the opposite direction. He made his debut in the competition two months later, receiving a straight card in the tenth minute on an eventual 2–0 home loss against Granada CF.

On 28 July 2021, Jorge was loaned to C.S. Marítimo of the Portuguese Primeira Liga for one year. The following 29 January, however, he moved to CD Mirandés back in his home country also in a temporary deal.

On 5 July 2022, Jorge joined CD Leganés also in the second division, on a one-year loan with a buyout clause.

Personal life
Jorge's older brother, Germán, was also a footballer. He too was groomed at Tenerife.

Career statistics

Club

References

External links
Tenerife official profile 

1996 births
Living people
Spanish footballers
Footballers from Santa Cruz de Tenerife
Association football defenders
La Liga players
Segunda División players
Tercera División players
CD Tenerife B players
CD Tenerife players
Valencia CF players
RC Celta de Vigo players
CD Mirandés footballers
CD Leganés players
Primeira Liga players
C.S. Marítimo players
Spain youth international footballers
Spain under-21 international footballers
Spanish expatriate footballers
Expatriate footballers in Portugal
Spanish expatriate sportspeople in Portugal